"If You Go" is a song written by Jon Secada and Miguel Morejon and recorded for his 1994 studio album, Heart, Soul & a Voice. The song's lyrics detail a desire that a female subject not leave the singer, for, if she does, "there'll be something missing in [his] life." A Spanish version, "Si te vas", was also released for the Spanish-language market.

The song was released as a single on April 26, 1994, peaking at number 10 on the US Billboard Hot 100 and becoming Secada's last top-ten single on the chart. It also performed well in some international markets, especially Canada, where it reached number three and topped the country's Adult Contemporary chart. The music video for the Spanish version was nominated for a Lo Nuestro Award for Video of the Year at the 7th Lo Nuestro Awards.

Track listings

US and Australian CD single
 "If You Go" – 3:45
 "Si te vas" – 3:45
 "If You Go / Si te vas" (Spanglish) – 3:45
 "If You Go" (West End mix) – 6:28
 "If You Go" (Clapapella mix) – 3:17

US and Canadian cassette single
 "If You Go" – 3:45
 "Si te vas" – 3:45

Japanese mini-CD single
 "If You Go"
 "If You Go" (Spanish version)
 "If You Go / Si te vas" (Spanglish version)

UK CD single
 "If You Go"
 "If You Go" (Spanish version)
 "If You Go / Si te vas" (Spanglish version)
 "If You Go" (dance mix)

UK 7-inch and cassette single, European CD single
 "If You Go" (radio edit)
 "If You Go" (Spanish version)

European maxi-CD single
 "If You Go" (radio edit)
 "If You Go" (Spanish version)
 "If You Go" (dance mix)
 "La La La" (album version)

Charts

Weekly charts

Year-end charts

Decade-end charts

Release history

See also
 Lo Nuestro Award for Video of the Year

References

1994 singles
1994 songs
Jon Secada songs
SBK Records singles
Song recordings produced by Emilio Estefan
Songs written by Jon Secada
Songs written by Miguel A. Morejon